The Grace family was an English cricketing family. Fourteen members of the family played first-class cricket, with brothers W. G., E. M. and Fred Grace (sometimes called the "three Graces") all going on to play Test cricket for England

Members

Grace family
Henry Mills Grace (1808–71), played for West Gloucestershire and South Wales in 1855.
Henry Grace (1833–95), played three first-class matches during the 1871 season.
Alfred Grace senior (1840–1916), played for Gentlemen of Gloucestershire and two matches for a United South of England XI in 1877 and 1879.
Alfred Grace junior (1866–1929), played two first-class matches for Gloucestershire in 1886 and 1891.
E. M. Grace (1841–1911), played 314 first-class matches, including one Test for England.
Edward Grace (1873–1953), played for Thornbury Castle, a South Gloucestershire side, in 1894.
Edgar Grace (1886–1974), played for Gloucestershire Gypsies between 1930–33.
Norman Grace (1894–1975), played three first-class matches for the Royal Navy between 1920–27.
W. G. Grace (1848–1915), played 880 first-class matches, including 22 Tests for England. 
W. G. Grace junior (1874–1905), played 57 first-class matches.
Henry Grace (1876-1937), Naval officer and Chief of the Submarine Service
Charles Grace (1882–1938), played four first-class matches for London County Cricket Club and WG Grace's XI in 1900.
Fred Grace (1850–80), played 195 first-class matches, including one Test for England.

Gilbert family
George and Walter Gilbert were nephew and great-nephew respectively of Henry Mills Grace:
George Gilbert (1829–1906), played 18 first-class matches. Later emigrated to New South Wales.
Walter Gilbert (1853–1924), played 157 first-class matches from 1871–86.

Pocock family
Alfred and William Pocock were brother and nephew respectively of Martha Grace, the mother of WG Grace:
Alfred Pocock (1814–97), played for Gentlemen of Gloucestershire and South Wales between 1854 and 1863.
William Pocock (1848–1928), played eight first-class matches for New South Wales and Canterbury after emigrating to Australia. Also umpired a first-class match in 1882.
NOTE: Some sources suggest that New Zealand cricketer Blair Pocock is related to Alfred and William, but documentary evidence has yet to be shown supporting this claim.

Rees family
William L. Rees married Martha Grace's niece, Mary Pocock. The Rees family later emigrated to Australasia:
William Gilbert Rees (1827–98), played one first-class match for New South Wales in 1856.
William Lee Rees (1836–1912), played four first-class matches in Australia and New Zealand.
Annie Rees (1864–1949) was a New Zealand writer, teacher and lawyer.
Arthur Rees (1866–1921), played six first-class matches in New Zealand.
Rosemary Rees (c.1875–1963) was a New Zealand actress, playwright and novelist.

Notes

 
English families
Family
Sports families of the United Kingdom